Roszkowo may refer to the following places:
Roszkowo, Kościan County in Greater Poland Voivodeship (west-central Poland)
Roszkowo, Rawicz County in Greater Poland Voivodeship (west-central Poland)
Roszkowo, Wągrowiec County in Greater Poland Voivodeship (west-central Poland)
Roszkowo, Pomeranian Voivodeship (north Poland)